Jonathan Robert Gibbs (born 6 May 1961)  is a Church of England bishop. He is the current Bishop of Rochester, the diocesan bishop for the Diocese of Rochester. He served as the first Bishop of Huddersfield between 2014 and 2022.

Early life and education
Gibbs was born on 6 May 1961. He was educated at The King's School, a private school in Chester, Cheshire. He then studied Philosophy and Politics at Jesus College, Oxford, and graduated with a Bachelor of Arts (BA) degree; as per tradition, his BA was later promoted to Master of Arts (MA Oxon) degree.

In 1984, Gibbs entered Ridley Hall, Cambridge, an Anglican theological college, to train for ordained ministry. He also undertook postgraduate research at Jesus College, Cambridge, completing a Doctor of Philosophy (PhD) degree in 1990. His doctoral thesis was titled "The challenge of transformation: towards a theology of work in the light of the thought of H. Richard Niebuhr".

Ordained ministry
Gibbs was ordained in the Church of England as a deacon in 1989 and as a priest in 1990. He served his curacy at Holy Trinity and Christ Church, Stalybridge, in the Diocese of Chester. He was the Intercontinental Church Society Chaplain at Basel (Switzerland) and Freiburg im Breisgau (Germany) from 1992 until 1998. He was then the incumbent at Heswall from 1998 until his elevation to the episcopate in 2014.

Episcopal ministry
In August 2014, it was announced that Gibbs would be the first Bishop of Huddersfield, an area bishop in the newly created Diocese of Leeds. On 17 October 2014, he was consecrated a bishop by John Sentamu, Archbishop of York, during a service at York Minster.

On 31 March 2022, it was announced that Gibbs would succeed James Langstaff as the Bishop of Rochester, the diocesan bishop of the diocese of Rochester. He took up the See on 24 May 2022 (at St Mary-le-Bow) at the confirmation of his election and was afterwards installed as Bishop of Rochester during a service at Rochester Cathedral on 24 September 2022.

Views
In 2023, following the news that the House of Bishop's of the Church of England was to introduce proposals for blessing same-sex relationships, he signed an open letter which stated:

Personal life
Gibbs is married to Toni. Together, they have three children; Harriet, Edward and Thomas.

References

Living people
1961 births
Bishops of Huddersfield
Bishops of Rochester
Alumni of Jesus College, Cambridge
Alumni of Ridley Hall, Cambridge
People educated at The King's School, Chester
Alumni of Jesus College, Oxford